Raja Muhammad Awais Khan is a Pakistani politician who was a Member of the Provincial Assembly of the Punjab, from May 2013 to May 2018.

Early life and education
He was born on 9 March 1973 in Jhelum.

He has a degree of Bachelor of Arts which he received from University of the Punjab.

Political career

He was elected to the Provincial Assembly of the Punjab as a candidate of Pakistan Muslim League (Nawaz) from Constituency PP-24 (Jhelum-I) in 2013 Pakistani general election.

In December 2013, he was appointed as Parliamentary Secretary for Zakat and ushr.

References

Living people
Punjab MPAs 2013–2018
1973 births
Pakistan Muslim League (N) politicians

Politicians from Jhelum